Byfield railway station was a railway station serving  Byfield in the English county of Northamptonshire.

History
It was not very successful and in 1877 the two trains a day in each direction were discontinued. However, in 1899 the London extension of the Great Central Railway  was opened through  which brought extra traffic. Great Central services reached Byfield via Woodford South Curve which was built at the same time. The curve was officially closed on 22 October 1900, but the rails remained in-situ for many years afterwards although the points were disconnected.

The line was also helped by a partial reorganisation in 1908 and its merger into the Stratford-upon-Avon and Midland Junction Railway The group of lines carried on unsteadily until grouping in 1923 when they became part of the London Midland and Scottish Railway  By 1905 there were four trains off the Great Central line and two Woodford to Stratford services.

However demand reduced until in 1946 there was one morning through train each way, and one each way between Towcester and Byfield. The station closed on 5 April 1952, with freight finishing on 1 March 1965,

The design of the station buildings was virtually the same as all the others on the line, with two platforms serving a passing loop in the otherwise single line. There was a single line siding with a goods shed and a timber signal box.  To avoid having a crossing, the station was built close to an overbridge carrying the A361 road.

The signal box's main function was to operate the ETS token system, although there was a facility to switch Byfield box out and operate a long block. Today, virtually all trace of the line and the station has disappeared

Remains
A single platform which is partly buried, and the foundations for the old goods shed which are in a severe state of decay, are all that remains of the railway station.

Routes

See also
 Beeching Axe

References

External links
 Byfield station on navigable 1946 O. S. map

Disused railway stations in Northamptonshire
Former Stratford-upon-Avon and Midland Junction Railway stations
Railway stations in Great Britain opened in 1873
Railway stations in Great Britain closed in 1952
West Northamptonshire District